Lackenbach is an Austrian municipality in the District of Oberpullendorf, Burgenland.

Geography 
Lackenbach lies in the Oberpullendorf District, the Middle Burgenland and is not divided into any districts.

History 
Between 1548 and 1552, Lackenbach was developed as a fort. After 1670-71 many Jews from Vienna settled there. From the 18th century, Lackenbach belonged to Prince Esterházy's Siebengemeinden where the Jews had their own autonomous administration.

The town, like the rest of Burgenland, belonged to the Kingdom of Hungary until 1920–21. After the end of the First World War, the western border area of Hungary was awarded to Austria by the Treaties of St. Germain and Trianon. Since 1921, the town has belonged to the newly founded State of Burgenland.

In 1940, a "Gypsy-Anhaltelager" was established on municipal territory at a former estate of the Esterházys. The inmates, mainly Romani from Burgenland, were made to do forced labor and, starting in 1943, were partially deported to Auschwitz-Birkenau where they were murdered. At the end of March 1945, the camp's administrators fled the approaching Red Army, so there were never any evacuation marches.

Politics 
Lackenbach's mayor is Ing. Heinrich Dorner of the SPÖ, and its vice-mayor is Gerhard Wukovits of the ÖVP. The chief officer is Christian Janitsch.

The mandate assignments in the Municipal Council (19 seats) are SPÖ 11, ÖVP 8, FPÖ 0, Grüne 0, and other lists 0.

Notable residents 
 Julius Deutsch, Austrian politician born here
 Tobias Jakobovits, rabbi, historian, and librarian
 Rudolf Sarközi, Romani community leader, born in the Lackenbach concentration camp
 Shalom Ullmann, Bavaria-born rabbi, lived and died here

Gallery

References

 The information in this article is based on a translation of its German equivalent.

See also 
 Siebengemeinden
 Weyer concentration camp

Cities and towns in Oberpullendorf District
Esterházy family
Siebengemeinden
Nazi concentration camps in Austria
Holocaust locations in Austria